Harold Armstead Covington (September 14, 1953 – July 14, 2018) was an American neo-Nazi activist and writer. Covington advocated the creation of an "Aryan homeland" in the Pacific Northwest (known as the Northwest Territorial Imperative), and was the founder of the Northwest Front (NF), a political movement which promoted white separatism.

Early life (19531971)
Covington was born in Burlington, North Carolina in 1953 as the eldest of three children. According to an interview with Covington, at age 15 in 1968 he was sent to Chapel Hill High School.

In 1971, he graduated from high school and joined the United States Army.

Political activities, Rhodesia and South Africa (19711979)
In 1971, Covington joined the National Socialist White People's Party (NSWPP), the political successor to the American Nazi Party (ANP).  He moved to South Africa in December 1973, after his discharge from the U.S. Army, and later to Rhodesia (now Zimbabwe). Covington was a founding member of the Rhodesian White People's Party, and later claimed to have served in the Rhodesian Army. He was deported from Rhodesia due to his racist beliefs, particularly due to his threatening letters to the Jewish Community.

Political activities after returning from Rhodesia
In 1980, while leader of the National Socialist Party of America, he lost a primary election for the Republican nomination for candidates for attorney general of North Carolina. Covington resigned as president of the NSPA in 1981. That same year, Covington alleged that would-be presidential assassin John Hinckley Jr. had formerly been a member of the NSPA. Law enforcement authorities were never able to corroborate this claim, and suggested the alleged connection "may have been fabricated for publicity purposes".

Covington later settled in the United Kingdom for several years, where he made contact with British far-right groups and was involved in setting up the neo-Nazi terrorist organisation Combat 18 (C18) in 1992. C18 openly promotes violence and antisemitism, and has adopted some of the features of the American far right.

In 1994, Covington started an organization called the National Socialist White People's Party, using the same name of the successor to the American Nazi Party under Matt Koehl in Chapel Hill, North Carolina. He launched a website in 1996; using the pseudonym "Winston Smith" (taken from the novel Nineteen Eighty-Four), Covington became one of the first neo-Nazi presences on the Internet. Covington used the website and the Winston Smith pseudonym to disseminate Holocaust-denial material.

Beginning in 2005, Covington maintained a political blog titled "Thoughtcrime". As a fiction writer, Covington authored several occult-themed novels. As an author, he is best known for his series of five Northwest Independence novels: A Distant Thunder, A Mighty Fortress, The Hill of the Ravens,  The Brigade, and Freedom's Sons.

Covington was mentioned in the media in connection with the Charleston church shooting, whose perpetrator Dylann Roof discussed the Northwest Front in his manifesto, and was critical of its means and objectives. According to Covington, the shooting was "a preview of coming attractions", but he also believed it was a bad idea for his followers to engage in random acts of violence, supporting organized revolution instead.

Death
Covington died in Bremerton, Washington, on July 14, 2018.

References

1953 births
2018 deaths
20th-century far-right politicians in the United States
United States Army soldiers
20th-century American novelists
21st-century American novelists
American science fiction writers
American fantasy writers
American male novelists
American neo-Nazis
People from Burlington, North Carolina
Novelists from North Carolina
Foreign volunteers in the Rhodesian Security Forces
20th-century American male writers
21st-century American male writers
American expatriates in Rhodesia
North Carolina Republicans
Chapel Hill High School (Chapel Hill, North Carolina) alumni
People deported from Rhodesia
Neo-Nazi politicians in the United States
Activists from North Carolina